Cruisin' may refer to:

Music
 [[Cruisin' (Village People album)|Cruisin''' (Village People album)]], 1978
 [[Cruisin' (Junko Onishi album)|Cruisin' (Junko Onishi album)]], 1993
 "Cruisin'" (Smokey Robinson song), 1979, covered by D'Angelo and by Huey Lewis and Gwyneth Paltrow
 "Cruisin'" (Michael Nesmith song), 1979
 "Cruisin'" (Earth, Wind & Fire song), 1996
 "Cruisin, a 1957 song by Gene Vincent & His Blue Caps
 "Cruisin, a 2003 song by Sioen

Video games
 Cruis'n, a racing video game series
 City Connection, also known as Cruisin, a 1985 arcade game
 Cruisin', a difficulty level in the video game Elite Beat Agents''

See also
 Cruising (disambiguation)
 ''Cruisin''' (sampler series), a pop music sampler series that covered the years 1955–1970